Dove Valley is an unincorporated community and a census-designated place (CDP) located in and governed by Arapahoe County, Colorado, United States. The CDP is a part of the Denver–Aurora–Lakewood, CO Metropolitan Statistical Area. The population of the Dove Valley CDP was 5,243 at the United States Census 2010. The Dove Valley Metropolitan District provides services to the area, which lies in ZIP code 80112.

Geography

Demographics

Economy

The headquarters and training camp of the Denver Broncos, as well as Centennial Airport, are located in Dove Valley. Air Methods and Key Lime Air have their corporate headquarters in the CDP as well. The indoor tennis facility the Randy Ross Tennis Center is also right in the heart of Dove Valley. 

Air Methods's headquarters were previously in the CDP, on the airport property; it moved to Greenwood Village, Colorado in 2017.

See also

Outline of Colorado
Index of Colorado-related articles
State of Colorado
Colorado cities and towns
Colorado census designated places
Colorado counties
Arapahoe County, Colorado
Colorado metropolitan areas
Front Range Urban Corridor
North Central Colorado Urban Area
Denver-Aurora-Boulder, CO Combined Statistical Area
Denver-Aurora-Broomfield, CO Metropolitan Statistical Area

References

External links

Dove Valley Metropolitan District website
Arapahoe County website

Census-designated places in Arapahoe County, Colorado
Census-designated places in Colorado
Denver metropolitan area